Inocybe calamistratoides is a species of Inocybaceae fungus found in New Zealand.

See also

List of Inocybe species

References

Fungi of New Zealand
calamistratoides